Flávio Emanuel Lopes Paixão (born 19 September 1984) is a Portuguese professional footballer who plays for Polish club Lechia Gdańsk as a forward.

He never played professionally in his own country, and had his greatest successes in Poland, scoring over 100 Ekstraklasa goals for Śląsk Wrocław and Lechia Gdańsk. Additionally, he had spells in Spain, Scotland and Iran.

Club career

Early years
Born in Sesimbra, Setúbal District, Paixão spent his early career in Portugal and Spain, playing with lowly teams in both countries – his hometown's G.D. Sesimbra, FC Porto B, CF Villanovense, Real Jaén and Benidorm CF.

In the 2006–07 season, he scored ten goals for Villanovense but suffered relegation from Segunda División B, the only level in which he competed in Spain.

Hamilton Academical
Paixão's first taste of professional football came in 2009 as he signed for Scottish Premier League club Hamilton Academical on 6 August, alongside twin brother Marco. He made his league debut nine days later, playing the full 90 minutes of a 3–0 loss away to Kilmarnock.

Paixão was released from his contract with immediate effect on 14 April 2011, alongside his sibling. He appeared in 61 official matches for the Accies, scoring 11 goals; his first was in a 2–1 loss at Heart of Midlothian on 26 September 2009.

Tractor
On 2 August 2011, Paixão signed a one-year contract with Tractor S.C. in Iran, for an undisclosed fee. In his first season he netted a club-best ten goals in the Pro League, being voted by Goal.com as best player on the team.

Śląsk Wrocław
Paixão then returned to Europe, joining Polish Ekstraklasa's Śląsk Wrocław at the tail end of the 2013–14 campaign. In his first full season he scored 18 goals, bettered only by Kamil Wilczek from Piast Gliwice; this included a hat-trick on 25 October 2014 in a 4–1 win at Lechia Gdańsk.

Lechia Gdańsk

On 8 February 2016, Paixão moved to Lechia Gdańsk for a fee of £100,000 with two years left on his contract, with Śląsk unhappy with the player's behaviour and accusing him of being disloyal– he reunited with his sibling, who arrived earlier from AC Sparta Prague. He scored a combined 26 goals in his first two and a half seasons, adding ten in all competitions in 2017–18, five of which were against Lechia's main rivals Arka Gdynia in the Tricity Derby.

The 2018–19 campaign proved to be Paixão's best in terms of goalscoring with 15 goals in total, with him being his team's top scorer and the fifth highest in the league as they finished in third position. He broke a long-standing Lechia record of scoring the most goals for the team in the Polish top division, surpassing previous holder Bogdan Adamczyk on 25 November 2018 after finding the net against Jagiellonia Białystok. He also won the Polish Cup, assisting the only goal of the final on 2 May against Jagiellonia for Artur Sobiech in added time, having earlier had a goal ruled out by the video assistant referee for offside.

At the start of the 2019–20, Paixão started in the Polish Super Cup, helping his side win the match 3–1 after defeating Piast. He scored in both legs of the second qualifying round in the UEFA Europa League against Brøndby IF (5–3 aggregate loss), and as a result became the first club player to achieve the feat more than once in European competition.

On 23 April 2022, Paixão scored his 99th and 100th goals in the Polish top tier in a 2–0 win against Warta Poznań, becoming the 34th player in the league's history to achieve this feat and the first foreigner to do so. His second was also Lechia's 1000th in the history of the competition.

International career
During their spell in Poland, both Paixão and his sibling were repeatedly poised to be called up to the Portugal national team, but nothing came of it.

Personal life
Paixão's twin brother Marco was also a footballer, Flávio being the younger by five minutes.

Career statistics

Honours
Lechia Gdańsk
Polish Cup: 2018–19
Polish Super Cup: 2019

References

External links

1984 births
Living people
People from Sesimbra
Portuguese twins
Twin sportspeople
Sportspeople from Setúbal District
Portuguese footballers
Association football forwards
Segunda Divisão players
G.D. Sesimbra footballers
FC Porto B players
Segunda División B players
CF Villanovense players
Real Jaén footballers
Benidorm CF footballers
Scottish Premier League players
Hamilton Academical F.C. players
Persian Gulf Pro League players
Tractor S.C. players
Ekstraklasa players
Śląsk Wrocław players
Lechia Gdańsk players
Portuguese expatriate footballers
Expatriate footballers in Spain
Expatriate footballers in Scotland
Expatriate footballers in Iran
Expatriate footballers in Poland
Portuguese expatriate sportspeople in Spain
Portuguese expatriate sportspeople in Scotland
Portuguese expatriate sportspeople in Iran
Portuguese expatriate sportspeople in Poland